This season marked Slough Jets 25th Anniversary.

Schedule and results

Preseason

|- align="center" bgcolor="#bbffbb"
| 1 || 14 September || @Swindon Wildcats || 4–2 || || Rockman (1–0–0) || Murdy (0–1–0) || N/A|| 1–0–0 || Link Centre || W1
|- align="center" bgcolor="ffbbbb"
| 2 || 17 September || Bracknell Bees ||| 4-5 || || Annetts (1-0-0) || Rockman (1-1-0) || N/A || 1-1-0|| The Hangar || L1
|- align="center" bgcolor="ffbbbb"
| 3 || 18 September || @ Bracknell Bees || 4-7 || || Ambler (1-0-0) || Rockman (1-2-0) || 1018 || 1-2-0 || John Nike Leisuresport Complex|| L2
|- align="center" bgcolor="bbffbb"
| 4 || 21 September || Swindon Wildcats || 5-3 || || Rockman (2-2-0) || Murdy (2–2–0) || 125 || 2-2-0 || The Hangar || W1
|-

Regular season

|- align="center" bgcolor=Red
|- align="center" bgcolor=Blue
|- align="center" bgcolor="#ffbbbb"
| 1 || 24 September || vs. Manchester Phoenix || 3-5 || || Steve Fone (1–0–0) || Greg Rockman (0–1–0) || N/A || 0–1–0 || The Hangar|| L1 || bgcolor="ffbbbb" | 0
|- align="center" bgcolor="#ffbbbb"
| 2 || 25 September || @ Bracknell Bees || 2–5 || || Tom Annets (1–0–0) || Greg Rockman (0–2–0) || N/A || 0–2–0 || John Nike Leisuresport Complex || L2 || bgcolor="ffbbbb" | 0
|-

|- align="center" bgcolor=Red
|- align="center" bgcolor=Blue
|- align="center" bgcolor="bbffbb"
| 3 || 1 October|| vs. Bracknell Bees || 7-3 || || Rockman (1–2–0) || Annetts (1–1–0) || N/A || 1–2–0 || The Hangar|| W1 || bgcolor="bbcaff" | 2
|- align="center" bgcolor="bbffbb"
| 4 || 2 October || @ Peterborough Phantoms || 7-4 || || Rockman (2–2–0) || King (0–2–0) || N/A || 2–2–0 || Planet Ice Peterborough|| W2 || bgcolor="bbcaff" | 4
|- align="center" bgcolor="bbffbb"
| 5 || 8 October || @ Basingstoke Bison || 7-6 || || Rockman (3–2–0) || || || 3-2-0 || Planet Ice Silverdome Arena|| W3 || bgcolor="bbcaff" | 6
|- align="center" bgcolor="f7e1d7"
| 6 || 9 October || vs. Milton Keynes Lightning || 1-3 || || || Rockman (3–3–0) || || 3-3-0 || The Hangar || L1 || bgcolor="bbcaff" | 6
|- align="center" bgcolor="bbffbb"
| 7 || 15 October || vs. Sheffield Steeldogs || 4-1 || || Rockman (4–3–0) || || || 4-3-0 || The Hangar|| W1 || bgcolor="bbcaff" | 8
|- align="center" bgcolor="bbffbb"
| 8 || 16 October || @ Manchester Phoenix || 4-3 || Yes || Rockman (5–3–0) || || || 5-3-0 || Altrincham Ice Dome|| W2 || bgcolor="bbcaff" | 10
|- align="center" bgcolor="bbffbb"
| 9 || 22 October || vs. Guildford Flames || 4-1 || || Rockman (6–3–0) || || || 6-3-0 || The Hangar|| W3 || bgcolor="bbcaff" | 12
|- align="center" bgcolor="bbffbb"
| 10 || 23 October || @ Telford Tigers || 5-4 || Yes || Rockman (7–3–0) || || || 7-3-0 || Telford Ice Rink || W4 || bgcolor="bbcaff" | 14
|- align="center" bgcolor="bbffbb"
| 11 || 29 October || vs. Telford Tigers || 6-4 || || Rockman (8–3–0) || || || 8-3-0 || The Hangar|| W5 || bgcolor="bbcaff" | 16
|- align="center" bgcolor="bbffbb"
| 12 || 30 October || @ Peterborough Phantoms || 10-4 || || Rockman (9–3–0) || || || 9-3-0 || Planet Ice Peterborough|| W6 || bgcolor="bbcaff" | 18
|-

|- align="center" bgcolor="FFFFFF"
| 13 || 5 November || @ Swindon Wildcats || 5:45p GMT || || || Link Centre
|- align="center" bgcolor="f7e1d7"
| 14 || 6 November || vs. Swindon Wildcats || 6:30p GMT || || || The Hangar
|- align="center" bgcolor="f7e1d7"
| 15 || 12 November || vs. Peterborough Phantoms || 6:30p GMT || || || The Hangar
|- align="center" bgcolor="FFFFFF"
| 16 || 13 November ||@ Bracknell Bees || 6:00p GMT || || || John Nike Leisuresport Complex
|- align="center" bgcolor="FFFFFF"
| 17 || 16 November || @ Telford Tigers || 8:00p GMT || || || Telford Ice Rink
|- align="center" bgcolor="f7e1d7"
| 18 || 19 November || vs. Basingstoke Bison || 6:30p GMT || || ||The Hangar
|- align="center" bgcolor="FFFFFF"
| 19 || 20 November || @ Guildford Flames || 6:00p GMT || || || Guildford Spectrum
|- align="center" bgcolor="f7e1d7"
| 20 || 26 November || vs. Bracknell Bees || 6:30p GMT || || ||The Hangar
|- align="center" bgcolor="FFFFFF"
| 21 || 27 November || @ Manchester Phoenix || 5:30p GMT || || || Altrincham Ice Dome
|-

|- align="center" bgcolor="f7e1d7"
| 22 || 3 December || vs. Sheffield Steeldogs || 6:30p GMT || || || The Hangar
|- align="center" bgcolor="FFFFFF"
| 23 || 4 December || @ Sheffield Steeldogs || 5:30p GMT || || || iceSheffield
|- align="center" bgcolor="f7e1d7"
| 24 || 10 December || vs. Milton Keynes Lightning || 6:30p GMT || || || The Hangar
|- align="center" bgcolor="FFFFFF"
| 25 || 11 December ||@ Milton Keynes Lightning || 6:30p GMT || || || Planet Ice Milton Keynes
|- align="center" bgcolor="f7e1d7"
| 26 || 17 December || vs. Manchester Phoenix || 6:30p GMT || || || The Hangar
|- align="center" bgcolor="FFFFFF"
| 27 || 18 December || @ Peterborough Phantoms || 5:30p GMT || || ||Planet Ice Peterborugh
|- align="center" bgcolor="FFFFFF"
| 28 || 30 December || @ Swindon Wildcats || 7:45p GMT || || || Link Centre
|-

|- align="center" bgcolor="f7e1d7"
| 29 || 1 January || vs. Swindon Wildcats || 6:30p GMT || || || The Hangar
|- align="center" bgcolor="f7e1d7"
| 30 || 7 January || vs.Manchester Phoenix || 6:30p GMT || || || The Hangar
|- align="center" bgcolor="FFFFFF"
| 31 || 8 January || @ Sheffield Steeldogs || 5:30p GMT || || || iceSheffield
|- align="center" bgcolor="f7e1d7"
| 32 || 14 January ||vs. Telford Tigers || 6:30p GMT || || ||The Hangar
|- align="center" bgcolor="FFFFFF"
| 33 || 15 January || @ Guildford Flames || 6:00p GMT || || || Guildford Spectrum
|- align="center" bgcolor="f7e1d7"
| 34 || 21 January || vs.Bracknell Bees || 6:30p GMT || || ||The Hangar
|- align="center" bgcolor="FFFFFF"
| 35 || 22 January || @ Bracknell Bees || 6:00p GMT || || ||John Nike Leisuresport Complex
|- align="center" bgcolor="f7e1d7"
| 36 || 28 January || vs. Peterborough Phantoms || 6:00p GMT || || ||The Hangar
|- align="center" bgcolor="FFFFFF"
| 37 || 29 January || @ Basingstoke Bison || 5:30p GMT || || ||Planet Ice Silverdome Arena
|-

|- align="center" bgcolor="f7e1d7"
| 38 || 4 February || vs. Guildford Flames || 6:30p GMT || || || The Hangar
|- align="center" bgcolor="f7e1d7"
| 39 || 5 February || vs.Basingstoke Bison || 6:30p GMT || || || The Hangar
|- align="center" bgcolor="f7e1d7"
| 40 || 11 February || vs.Sheffield Steeldogs || 6:30p GMT || || || The Hangar
|- align="center" bgcolor="FFFFFF"
| 41 || 15 February ||@ Swindon Wildcats || 7:45p GMT || || ||Link Centre
|- align="center" bgcolor="f7e1d7"
| 42 || 18 February || vs. Peterborough Phantoms || 6:30p GMT || || || The Hangar
|- align="center" bgcolor="FFFFFF"
| 43 || 25 February || @Milton Keynes Lightning || 7:00p GMT || || ||Planet Ice Milton Keynes
|- align="center" bgcolor="FFFFFF"
| 44 || 26 February || @ Sheffield Steeldogs || 5:30p GMT || || ||iceSheffield
|-

|- align="center" bgcolor="FFFFFF"
| 45 || 3 March || @ Basingstoke Bison || 6:30p GMT || || || Planet Ice Silverdome Arena
|- align="center" bgcolor="f7e1d7"
| 46 || 4 March || vs.Basingstoke Bison || 6:30p GMT || || || The Hangar
|- align="center" bgcolor="f7e1d7"
| 47 || 10 March || vs.Guildford Flames || 6:30p GMT || || || The Hangar
|- align="center" bgcolor="FFFFFF"
| 48 || 11 March ||@ Guildford Flames || 6:00p GMT || || ||Guildford Spectrum
|- align="center" bgcolor="f7e1d7"
| 49 || 17 March || vs. Swindon Wildcats || 6:30p GMT || || || The Hangar
|- align="center" bgcolor="FFFFFF"
| 50 || 18 March || @Manchester Phoenix || 5:30p GMT || || ||Altrincham Ice Dome
|- align="center" bgcolor="f7e1d7"
| 51 || 24 March || vs. Telford Tigers || 6:30p GMT || || ||The Hangar
|- align="center" bgcolor="FFFFFF"
| 52 || 25 March || @ Telford Tigers || 5:30p GMT || || ||Telford Ice Rink
|- align="center" bgcolor="FFFFFF"
| 53 || 31 March || @ Milton Keynes Lightning || 7:00p GMT || || ||Planet Ice Milton Keynes
|-

|- align="center" bgcolor="f7e1d7"
| 54 || 1 April || vs. Milton Keynes Lightning || 6:30p GMT || || || The Hangar 
|-

League standings

Premier Cup standings

Roster

Transactions
The Jets have been involved in the following transactions during the 2011–12 season.

Players Out

Players In

Players To Unknown

|}

Time Out From Ice Hockey

Contract extensions

Two-Way Contracts
On 24 August 2011, Head Coach Doug Sheppherd announced that 3 players would be joining the Jets on 2 way contracts and so will be training and playing with the EPL Jets whenever possible

|}

Other Slough–based teams in 2011–12
 Slough Town FC 2011/12 season

References

Slough Jets seasons
Slou